The Broxbourne Council election, 1983 was held to elect council members of the Broxbourne Borough Council, the local government authority of the borough of Broxbourne,  Hertfordshire, England.

Composition of expiring seats before election

Election results

Results summary 

An election was held in 14 wards on 5 May 1983.

15 seats were contested (2 seats in Bury Green Ward)

The Conservative Party made a gain from the Labour Party in Rye Park Ward.

The SDP - Liberal Alliance made gains from the Conservative Party in Hoddesdon Town and Rosedale Wards

The political balance of the council following this election was:

Conservative 32 seats
Labour 6 seats
SDP-Liberal Alliance 4 Seats

Ward results

References
Cheshunt & Waltham Telegraph Friday 13 May 1983 Edition

1983
1983 English local elections
1980s in Hertfordshire